The 2016–17 Major Arena Soccer League season was the ninth season for the league and the third since six teams from the former Major Indoor Soccer League defected to what was formerly called the Professional Arena Soccer League. The regular season started on October 29, 2016, and ended on March 5, 2017. Each team played a 20-game schedule. The defending champions were the Baltimore Blast. The Blast repeated in 2016–17, defeating the Sonora Suns in the Ron Newman Cup, 2–1.

Teams
Of the 20 teams that competed in the 2015–16 season, the Waza Flo, Las Vegas Legends, Brownsville Barracudas, Saltillo Rancho Seco, and Sacramento Surge did not return for the 2016–17 season. The Florida Tropics SC and El Paso Coyotes joined the MASL for this season, bringing the total number of teams in the league to 17.

In the offseason, the Baltimore Blast, Harrisburg Heat, St. Louis Ambush left the MASL, and joined the expansion Tropics to form the Indoor Professional League. The Blast, Heat and Ambush re-joined the MASL in August 2016, with the Tropics being considered an expansion franchise for the MASL. Additionally the Missouri Comets announced in September 2016 that they were renaming themselves the Kansas City Comets.

Standings
Final as of March 6, 2017

(Bold) Division Winner

Eastern Conference

Western Conference

2017 Ron Newman Cup
The Ron Newman Cup playoffs will begin after the regular season ends on March 5, 2017. The top two teams from each division will qualify for the post-season, with each round being a 2-game home and home series, with a 15-minute mini-game played immediately after Game 2 if the series is tied.

Eastern Conference Playoffs

Eastern Division Final

Baltimore wins series 2–1

Central Division Final

Milwaukee wins series 2–1

Eastern Conference Final

Baltimore wins series 2–1

Western Conference Playoffs

Southwest Division Final

Sonora wins series 2–0

Pacific Division Final

San Diego wins series 2–1

Western Conference Final

Sonora wins series 2–0

2017 Ron Newman Cup Finals

Baltimore wins series 2–1

Statistics

Top Scorers
Last updated on March 6, 2017.

Awards

Individual Awards

All-League First Team

All-League Second Team

All-League Third Team

All-Rookie Team

Attendances

References

External links
MASL official website

 
Major Arena Soccer League
 
Major Arena Soccer League
Major Arena Soccer League seasons